Uzuntarla is a village in the Tunceli District, Tunceli Province, Turkey. The village is populated by Kurds of the Demenan tribe and had a population of 78 in 2021.

References 

Villages in Tunceli District
Kurdish settlements in Tunceli Province